Cyrille Aimée (born August 10, 1984) is a French jazz singer.

Biography 
She grew up in the French town of Samois-sur-Seine, in Fontainebleau, France. Her father is French and her mother is from the Dominican Republic.

She won the Montreux Jazz Festival Competition in 2007, was a finalist in the Thelonious Monk International Jazz Competition in 2010, and won the Sarah Vaughan International Jazz Competition in 2012.

Her 2019 album Move On featured cover versions of songs by Stephen Sondheim. The album received praise from Sondheim himself, and one of its songs, "Marry Me a Little", was nominated for a Grammy Award.

Critical reception 
New York Times music reviewer Stephen Holden described Aimée as a blend of Michael Jackson and Sarah Vaughan and wrote that the "saucy, curly-haired jazz singer [stood] with one foot in tradition and the other in electronics," and that her voice had a "tart, girlish chirp" and that her Surreal Band fused traditional and futuristic electronics with textures mixing jazz and funk. New York Times reviewer Nate Chinen wrote that she had a "sweet, girlish voice that she controls with a sniper's precision".

Star-Ledger reviewer Ronni Reich described her sound as "instantly recognizable" with a "soft, girlish buzz with a touch of an Edith Piaf-like quaver." Reviewer John Fordham in The Guardian wrote that she is a "subtle and articulate vocalist" who is "light-stepping, casually fluent and persuasive" and sometimes "coolly understated in a soft glide." Classicalite reviewer Mike Greenblatt described Aimée as "beautiful, talented, precocious, funny, cultured, with the kind of instantly-recognizable voice that has no known precedent."

Aimée was also singled out for particular praise for her role in Alex Webb (musician)'s music theatre piece Cafe Society Swing at New York's 59E59 Theaters in Christmas 2014, where she starred alongside vocalists Charenee Wade and Allan Harris. The show received a Critic's Pick in the New York Times.

Discography 
 One More by Crème Fraîche -- The Lost Recordings (2006)
 Cyrille Aimée and the Surreal Band (2009)
 Smile (Cyrille Aimée Music, 2009) with Diego Figueiredo
 Just the Two of Us (Venus, 2010) with Diego Figueiredo
 Live at Small's (SmallsLIVE, 2010)
 Live at Birdland (Cyrillemusic, 2013)
 Burstin' Out, Chicago Jazz Orchestra with Cyrille Aimée (Origin, 2013)
 It's a Good Day (Mack Avenue, 2014)
 Let's Get Lost (Mack Avenue, 2016)
 Cyrille Aimée Live (Mack Avenue, 2018)
 Move On: A Sondheim Adventure (Mack Avenue, 2019)
 I'll Be Seeing You (2021)

References

External links
 
 

Living people
French women jazz singers
French jazz singers
People from Fontainebleau
1984 births
21st-century French singers
21st-century French women singers
French people of Dominican Republic descent
Mack Avenue Records artists